Arab Ali (also Romanized as ʿArab Alī) is a village in Shahrabad Rural District, in the Central District of Firuzkuh County, Tehran Province, Iran. At the 2006 census, its population was 19, in 10 families.

References 

Populated places in Firuzkuh County